The List of railway routes in Bavaria provides a list of all railway routes in Bavaria. This includes Intercity-Express, Intercity, Regional-Express, Regionalbahn and S-Bahn services. In the route tables, the major stations are shown in bold text. Where intermediate stations are not given, these are replaced by three dots "...". The information is up to date to December 2020.

Regional services
The following Regional-Express and Regionalbahn services run through Bavaria:

Munich S-Bahn

Nuremberg S-Bahn

Danube-Iller Regional S-Bahn

See also 
 List of scheduled railway routes in Germany

References

External links 
 kursbuch.bahn.de Timetables for all railway routes in Germany

External links

Bavaria
Transport in Bavaria
Bavaria-related lists
Bavaria